Out with Dad is a Canadian web series created, written, directed, and produced by Jason Leaver. The series premiered on YouTube in 2010, and ran for five seasons, concluding in 2017. It follows Rose, a lesbian teenager, who struggles through the process of her coming out to her single father.

The series has won various awards, including several Indie Series Awards, and has screened at numerous festivals, including the Los Angeles Web Series Festival. As of April 2018, the series has over 40,000 subscribers and has been viewed over 25 million times on YouTube.

Background 
The series premiered on YouTube in 2010 and is filmed in and around Toronto, Ontario, Canada. It also streams on Blip and Dailymotion. The series shines a spotlight on the challenges of people in the LGBT community, specifically lesbians facing homophobia.

In 2011, the series was given an official endorsement by PFLAG Canada.

Since the conclusion of its third season, the series has been funded solely by fans through the online funding platform Patreon. In 2017, the fifth season, which consists of 5 episodes, was announced as the final season of the series.

Subtitles 
Fans of the series take upon it themselves to publish subtitles for the episodes on YouTube in many different languages, including:
 Germanic languages : English, Dutch, German
 Latine languages : French, Portuguese, Spanish, Italian
 Eastern European languages : Czech
 Partially subtitled in those languages : Russian (Seasons 1 & 2), Greek (Seasons 1 & 3) and Croatian (Seasons 1 & 3)

A deal with France Televisions led to the dubbing in French of the webseries, by its subsidiary MFP, for the broadcasting on France 4 channel of the episodes 1.01 to 3.06.

Episodes 
See List of episodes of Out with Dad

Cast 
See Out with Dad cast members

References

External links 
 Official website
 Watch all episodes

2010 web series debuts
2017 web series endings
Canadian drama web series
Canadian LGBT-related web series
Fictional lesbians
Fictional bisexual females
Homophobia in fiction
2010s Canadian LGBT-related drama television series